The 1985 WAFU Club Championship was the ninth football club tournament season that took place for the runners-up of each West African country's domestic league, the West African Club Championship. It was won by Africa Sports in two-legged final victory against Ifodje Atakpamé.

Not a single club from Niger participated.

Preliminary round
The matches took place from March 30 to April 14.

|}

Quarterfinals
The matches took place from May 26 to June 9.

|}

Semifinals
The matches took place from June 30 to July 14.

|}

Finals
The matches took place on October 20 and November 10.

|}

Winners

See also
1985 African Cup of Champions Clubs
1985 CAF Cup Winners' Cup

Notes

References

External links
Full results of the 1985 WAFU Club Championship at RSSSF

West African Club Championship
1985 in African football